The Sunda thrush (Zoothera andromedae) is a species of bird in the family Turdidae. It is found in Indonesia, Malaysia, and the Philippines.

Its natural habitats are subtropical or tropical moist lowland forests and subtropical or tropical moist montane forests.

References

Sunda thrush
Birds of Malesia
Sunda thrush
Taxonomy articles created by Polbot